Liaocheng railway station is a railway station in Dongchangfu District, Liaocheng, Shandong, China. It is an intermediate stop on the Beijing–Kowloon railway.

History
The station opened in 1996. At opening, there was around seven trains in each direction per day. By 2009, this had increased to around 31.

On 9 January 2012, a new station building was opened.

In 2016, the service level was around 54 trains in each direction per day.

See also
Liaocheng West railway station

References 

Railway stations in Henan
Railway stations in China opened in 1996